Pullad is a town in Thiruvalla Taluk  in Pathanamthitta district, Kerala.

Maramon, the place where Asia's largest Christian gathering, the Maramon convention takes place, is situated near Pullad, on the banks of Pamba river. Pullad  famous for its long and rich tradition in "Padayani". The famous Padinjattethil temple is in Pullad.  Pullad is also famous for its tapioca farming (known as "Pulladan Kappa")

Pullad is the part of Aranmula legislative assembly constituency and Pathanamthitta parliament constituency.

Demographics 
Koipuram is a large village located in Thiruvalla  of Pathanamthitta district, Kerala with total 7319 families residing. The Koipuram village has population of 26425 of which 12231 are males while 14194 are females as per Population Census 2011. In Koipuram village population of children with age 0-6 is 2011 which makes up 7.61% of total population of village. Average Sex Ratio of Koipuram village is 1160 which is higher than Kerala state average of 1084. Child Sex Ratio for the Koipuram as per census is 989, higher than Kerala average of 964.

Koipuram village has higher literacy rate compared to Kerala. In 2011, literacy rate of Koipuram village was 97.31% compared to 94.00% of Kerala. In Koipuram Male literacy stands at 97.57% while female literacy rate was 97.09%.

Nearby Places
 Kumbanad
 Eraviperoor
 Thiruvalla
 Mallapally
 Puramattam
 Arattupuzha
 Kozhencherry

See also
 Pathanamthitta

References 

Villages in Pathanamthitta district
Cities and towns in Pathanamthitta district

Thiruvalla taluk 

it:Thiruvalla